{{Automatic taxobox 
| image = Chaetanthus aristatus (male) (15248758990).jpg
| image_caption = Chaetanthus aristatus (male)
| taxon = Chaetanthus
| authority = R. Br.
| type_species = Chaetanthus leptocarpoides 
| type_species_authority = R. Br.
| synonyms_ref = 
| synonyms =
 Prionosepalum Steud.
}}Chaetanthus is a group of plants in the Restionaceae described as a genus in 1810.Brown, Robert. 1810. Prodromus florae Novae Hollandiae et Insulae Van-Diemen, exhibens characteres plantarum 251 The entire genus is endemic to the southern part of Western Australia.

 Species
 Chaetanthus aristatus (R.Br.) B.G.Briggs & L.A.S.Johnson
 Chaetanthus leptocarpoides R.Br.
 Chaetanthus tenellus'' (Nees) B.G.Briggs & L.A.S.Johnson

References

Restionaceae
Poales genera
Endemic flora of Australia
Taxa named by Robert Brown (botanist, born 1773)